St Kevin's College is an independent Catholic primary and secondary school for boys located in Melbourne, Victoria, Australia. The college has five campuses, three of which are in the suburb of Toorak, the fourth in Richmond, and the fifth being a sport campus located behind Stockland Tooronga. The school owned a campsite 'Silver Creek' in the town of Flowerdale which was completely destroyed by the Black Saturday bushfires.

St Kevin's was founded in 1918 by the Christian Brothers and is a member of the Associated Public Schools of Victoria. St Kevin's overlooks Gardiners Creek, a tributary that runs into the Yarra River, with Scotch College on the opposite side. The college has a long-standing tradition with the historic St. Patrick's Cathedral and is responsible for educating their choir boys.

The Archdiocese of Melbourne provides oversight of St Kevin's, and its administration is directed by Edmund Rice Education Australia (EREA), and is a member of both the Associated Public Schools of Victoria (APS) and the International Boys' Schools Coalition (IBSC).

History

The school was established in 1918 on the corner of Albert St and Eades St, East Melbourne by the Christian Brothers as St Kevin's Central College  with the purpose of being a school where the "brainy boys" of the other Christian Brothers Schools could further their education. In 1932, the school was moved to the corner of St George and Orrong Roads, Toorak. Property in Heyington was purchased and developed into playing fields for the use of all Christian Brothers Schools. This location is now the Senior School Campus, housing Years 7 to 8, and Years 10 through to Year 12, in a vertical house system.

The Heyington Campus, which is next to the Glen Waverley railway line, was built in 1960, its main feature being the Kearney Building.

The Lansell Road property was opened in 1972, and that same year the Orrong Road property was sold.

In 1982, the K.C. Smith building was constructed for the middle school years on the Senior Campus.
In 1990 the Pavilion was opened. Since its opening, the Pavilion has flooded twice, both in 2005. Ovals 1 and 2 were completely submerged.

The Cummins Building was refurbished in 1997, and currently houses the creative arts precinct, which includes arts, drama, music and artistic works. The McCarthy Building was opened that year, housing art studios, the campus library and the Administration Block.

The Lansell Road property is now home to the Glendalough Campus, and in 1999 became a full primary school, housing Prep to Year 6 students. Also in 1999, Year 9 students moved from the Senior Campus to a dedicated campus named Waterford in Richmond. Waterford currently resides in the former Vaucluse College FCJ site in Richmond. 1999 saw a major change in the structure of the school, with the introduction of the House System for Years 10 to 12. This saw the desegregation of year levels and their amalgamation into houses with five tutor groups comprising Year 10, Year 11 and Year 12 boys, accompanied by a tutor. Previously, boys were organised by year levels, and supervised by Year Level Coordinators, somewhat similar to the current system found in the Middle School (Years 7 to 9).

In March 2006, a $16 million indoor pool, gym and sports facility, the Wilding Centre, was blessed by Cardinal George Pell and opened for the students.

In 2009 the Godfrey Building was opened.

In 2010, the Boyd Egan Hall was opened at Glendalough and substantial floods filled the school's ovals and damaged the Fraser Tennis Courts.

In 2011, work began on a three-storey $14  million Science Wing, located adjacent to Heyington railway station at the end of the Kearney Building.

In 2013, the Kearney West Building was officially opened. The building contains science labs and woodwork rooms, which are used for senior classes.

In 2014, the McMahon Music Centre was opened at Glendalough and the remaining laboratories in the Kearney Building were refurbished. Music and drama facilities in the Cummins Building were modernised as well.

In 2017, the Tooronga Fields Campus was opened as the St Kevin's offsite sports ground.

2018 saw St Kevin's College celebrate its centenary year. A special 100-year logo was created and was used throughout the school year as well as on ties and a badge that the students received. Several celebrations were conducted, including a free lunch provided by the school, intended to pay homage to the older traditions of the College chartering a train from Heyington railway station to other parts of Melbourne for a school picnic. Special events such as "The Great Debate", featuring generations of St Kevin's old boys, took place and a limited-edition 100-year history of the college was published for students and staff.

Campuses

St Kevin's College has five campuses:
Glendalough – The St Kevin's College Junior School in Lansell Road, Toorak, is named after the location of the St Kevin's Monastery in Ireland. It houses students from Prep to Year 6.
Heyington – In 1932, the current site of the Heyington Campus was purchased and at the time was used for playing fields. It now serves as the main academic campus for Years 7, 8, 10, 11 and 12.
Waterford – Purchased by St Kevin's College in the early 2000s for the Year 9 campus and situated on Richmond Hill, it occupies the facilities of the former Vaucluse College.
St Peter's – An Early Learning Centre that is a co-venture with Loreto Mandeville Hall, this site is home to kindergarten students.
Tooronga – Opened on 17 June 2017 at a cost of $38 million, the Tooronga Fields Campus is a sports complex which consists of three soccer pitches as well as an Australian Rules oval. There are also 12 tennis courts that can be used as a hockey pitch. The site also includes a 200-metre athletics track with high jump and long jump training areas as well as 12 cricket nets, two pavilions containing unisex change rooms, viewing areas, half a basketball court and a function centre.

Houses 
The Houses for the Senior (Years 10 to 12) and Middle (Years 7 to 8) Schools are named after Christian Brothers associated with the college. They are:

The original 'Foundation' Houses are Cusack, Kearney, Kenny and Purton. These Houses are located in their original areas in the Kearney Building. The 'Extension' Houses are McCarthy and Rahill, added to extend the capacity of the House system in their years of establishment. McCarthy House occupies the former Brothers' Quarters in the Cummins Building, while Rahill House occupies a purpose-built area in the Godfrey Building.

Boys are assigned their House at their entry point into St Kevin's College, however during Years 7 to 9, they primarily serve as a means of organisation for co-curricular competitions such as House Swimming, House Athletics and House Sports.

Curriculum
St Kevin's College offers its Years 11 and 12 students the Victorian Certificate of Education (VCE), the main assessment program which ranks the students in the state.

The class of 2009 were the highest-performing academic group in the history of the modern VCE for St Kevin's College, making St Kevin's the top-performing, non-selective, all boys, Catholic and Associated Public Schools of Victoria-member school in 2009. 33 per cent of study scores were 40 or over, and 14 perfect scores were achieved across 10 subjects.

Publications
The English curriculum at St Kevin's allows for boys to develop their skills in the communication of ideas and is put into practice through the numerous publications that can be found in the college, each of which is aimed towards a certain audience, and has its own individual purpose.

 Senior School Newsletterdistributed weekly during semesters to parents, students, staff, members of the SKC Community (Years 7 to 12)
 Junior School Newsletterdistributed weekly during semesters to parents, students, staff, members of the SKC Community (Prep to Year 6)
 Omniamagazine issued once per school term to parents, students, staff, members of the SKC Community, alumni, prospective parents, prospective students (Prep to Year 12)
 The Waterford Chroniclenewspaper issued once per school term to students and teachers (Year 9)

Extracurricular activities

The school has a number of extracurricular activities.

Debating and public speaking
St Kevin's competes in the Debaters Association of Victoria Schools competition, and the Heyington Campus is the host venue for the Toorak regional competition. Five debates are held each year, and St Kevin's teams debate against other Melbourne schools on various current interest topics. St Kevin's participates in a range of other debating and public speaking tournaments, including those organised by Rotary, the RSL, UNYA and as of 2011, the WIDPSC, with one student competing representing Australia, and recording 8th place.

Sport
St Kevin's College is a member of the Associated Public Schools of Victoria. The college's teams take part in a wide range of sports at different levels of achievement. In 2009, the College won the soccer, Australian rules football and rugby premierships – the first time this was achieved in APS history. The College was formerly a member of the Associated Catholic Colleges from 1940–1957.

APS Premierships 
St Kevin's College has won the following APS premierships:

 Athletics (11) - 2006, 2007, 2008, 2011, 2012, 2013, 2014, 2015, 2017, 2018, 2019
 Badminton (3) - 2004, 2009, 2010
 Basketball (4) - 2001, 2007, 2011, 2018
 Cricket (6) - 1989, 1991, 1992, 2001, 2013, 2015
 Cross Country (7) - 2006, 2007, 2008, 2010, 2011, 2012, 2013, 2019
 Diving (7) - 2014, 2015, 2016, 2017, 2018, 2019, 2021
 Football (4) - 1997, 2009, 2011, 2012
 Futsal - 2018
 Soccer (2) - 2000, 2009
 Swimming & Diving* (5) - 2009, 2010, 2011, 2012, 2013
 Swimming (2) - 2016, 2021
 Tennis (7) - 1990, 1991, 1993, 1994, 1996, 2011, 2017, 2018

*From 1998 until 2013, swimming and diving events were tallied to be awarded as a single premiership.

Theatre and drama
St Kevin's has a theatre department and each year produces a number of plays, musicals and operas. A relationship between several different girls' schools has been established to enhance the co-curricular dramatic arts program.

Aviation
St Kevin's College offers an aviation program to its students. The program has been commended by aviators and industry experts, including Nancy Bird Walton.

Coat of arms, crest and motto
The current school crest was adopted by Kearney in 1933. The crest bears:

The Celtic Cross, signifying Irish heritage, in the top left quadrant
A single star, representing the Star of Knowledge, in the top right quadrant
The Southern Cross, representing Australia, in the bottom left quadrant
A book with the Greek Letters Alpha and Omega scribed, symbolising God is all from beginning to end, in the bottom right quadrant

The school's motto is, in Latin, Omnia Pro Deo, meaning 'All for God' or transliterated means 'All things for God'. This is taken from a letter of St Paul.

Touchstones 
As a member school of Edmund Rice Education Australia, St Kevin's has adopted the following touchstones which can be found on display around the several campuses and on the inside covers of school diaries. The touchstones are:

 Liberating Education
 Gospel Spirituality
 Inclusive Community
 Justice and Solidarity

These touchstones have also been adopted by other Edmund Rice Education Australia schools in a similar fashion to St Kevin's College.

Controversy

Student sexism 
On 21 October 2019, a viral video which showed some students performing a sexist chant while on public transport to an inter-school athletics event was made public. Following the resultant media furore, a public apology from Headmaster Stephen Russell was issued in a letter sent to all parents the following day. In this apology, Headmaster Russell denounced the students' "misogynistic" behaviour as "offensive". Ten students were reportedly suspended with the possibility of expulsion. Shortly thereafter, a second video was released in which three Year 12 students performed the same sexist chant in public only a few hours after the publication of the first video. The ABC further revealed that in 2018 a group of students made a derogatory rap song about female students from another school. Russell again condemned the students' behaviour as "foolish and reckless" and acknowledged that the college's cultural problems were "more widespread than [he] understood".

Mishandling of child abuse 
In February 2020, it was reported that Stephen Russell wrote a character reference for Peter Kehoe, a non-staff athletics coach accused of grooming a St Kevin's student while under the school's employ. Kehoe was subsequently convicted and sentenced to a community corrections order and placed on the sex offenders register for eight years. The victim settled a civil claim with the school in August 2019. Amid calls to resign, Russell responded by suggesting that Kehoe was a "never a member of staff" and expressed his remorse for providing Kehoe a character reference, stating: "I would not do it again". Victorian Premier Daniel Andrews said that Russell's response was "just not on" and suggested that Russell would have been removed from his position had he been the principal of a government school.

On 19 February, Russell resigned from the school and dean of sport, Luke Travers, was stood down pending further investigation. Later the same day, John Crowley, principal of St Patrick's College in Ballarat, was appointed as the acting Headmaster of St Kevin's. The employment of Simon Parris, a mathematic teacher, was "concluded" from the Toorak school in late February amid a series of staff removals over a child grooming scandal; and was subsequently suspended from teaching.  Janet Canny, a former deputy principal, stepped aside after court action was lodged against her over a complaint alleging breaches of mandatory reporting, and Gary Jones, a teacher, had his employment "concluded". At least six staff members were stood aside or left the school since Russell resigned.

Notable alumni

Clergy
Mark ColeridgeArchbishop of Brisbane

Media, entertainment and the arts

 Greg Cravencurrent Vice-Chancellor at the Australian Catholic University, advocate of republicanism, author
 Mark DavisAustralian journalist best known for his work on Dateline, five-time winner of the Walkley Award, winner of the Gold Walkley Award
 Joel DeaneAustralian novelist and poet, former chief speech writer for Victorian Premier Steve Bracks
 Matt Doranjournalist with the Seven Network
 Jacob Elordiactor
 Chet Faker (real name Nicholas Murphy)singer-songwriter
 Len Johnson - athlete and writer. Author of The Landy Era
 Vance Joy (real name James Keogh)singer-songwriter
 Victor McMahonvirtuoso flautist, educator
 Tim McDonaldcomedian, co-host of The Cheap Seats
 Damien Parerwar photographer, cinematographer for Australia's first Oscar-winning film Kokoda Front Line
 Steve Pizzatiformer Top Gear Australia host, motoring commentator
 Sam Sejavkaplaywright, actor, musician
 Rob Sitchdirector, producer, screenwriter, actor
 Bill Tippingjournalist, winner of the Walkley Award
 Francis Westaway, character in Toni Jordan's novel, Nine Days.
 Feliks ZemdegsRubik's Cube speedsolver

Politics, public service and the law

 Bill Bourkeformer politician, former Labor federal Member for Fawkner
 John Bourke former Labor Member for St Kilda in the Victorian Legislative Assembly
 Jack Comberformer Labor federal Member for Bowman
 Barney Cooneyformer Labor Senator for Victoria
 Frank Fieldformer Labor Member for Dandenong in the Victorian Legislative Assembly, 10th Deputy Premier of Victoria
 Jim McClellandformer Labor Senator for New South Wales, solicitor, jurist, Minister in the Third Whitlam Ministry, Royal Commissioner
 Clem Newton-Brownformer Liberal Member for Prahran in the Victorian Legislative Assembly
 Peter Randlesformer Labor, Labor Anti-Communist and Democratic Labor Member for Brunswick in the Victorian Legislative Assembly
 Scott RyanLiberal Senator for Victoria
 B. A. Santamariaprominent Australian Roman Catholic, journalist, anti-Communist political activist, founder of the Democratic Labor Party
 Ted Serong senior officer of the Australian Army, noted for his contributions to counter-insurgency and jungle warfare tactics during the Vietnam War
 Charles Sweeney former Federal Court Judge
 George Whiteformer Labor, Labor Anti-Communist and Democratic Labor Member for Mentone in the Victorian Legislative Assembly

Sport

 Tom AllisonAustralian rules footballer with North Melbourne Kangaroos
 Michael Blood - Australian rules footballer with Hawthorn Hawks
 Peter Bol -  Olympic Athlete and fastest Australian ever in 800m
 Peter Bourke - Athlete and Gold Medallist 800m Brisbane Commmonwealth Games 1982
 Michael BowdenAustralian rules footballer with Richmond Tigers and Melbourne Demons
 Morton Browne - Australian rules footballer with Hawthorn Hawks.
 Gary Brice - Australian rules footballer with South Melbourne
 Nick Bryan - AFL Footballer
 Jordan De GoeyAustralian rules footballer with Collingwoood Magpies
 Liam DonaldAustralian national rower
 Lachie FogartyAustralian rules footballer with Carlton Blues
 Neale Fraser tennis player, Wimbledon champion 1960 and former world number one
 Simon GarlickAustralian rules footballer with Sydney Swans and Western Bulldogs; football administrator
 Josh Giddey NBA Basketballer with the Oklahoma City Thunder

 Alexander GrahamCommonwealth Games gold medallist
 Oliver HanrahanAustralian rules footballer with Hawthorn Hawks
 Lachie HunterAustralian rules footballer with Western Bulldogs
 Henry Hutchisonrugby union player
 John Higham - Four time Australian champion in athletics and Commonwealth Games bronze medallist. 
 Tom JokAustralian rules footballer with Essendon Bombers
 Laurie KerrAustralian rules footballer with Car Blues; founder of the Carlton Social Club at Princes Park
 Peter Kerr - Australian Rules Footballer with Carlton Blues
 Pat KerrAustralian rules footballer with Carlton Blues
 Phonse Kyneformer Australian rules footballer, captain and coach with Collingwood Magpies
 Allan La Fontaineformer Australian rules footballer, captain and coach with Melbourne Demons
 Tom LiberatoreAustralian rules footballer with Western Bulldogs
 Jack MahonyAustralian rules footballer with North Melbourne Kangaroos
 Josh Mahoneyformer Australian rules footballer with Port Adelaide
 Luke Mathews (born 21 June 1995), Olympic middle-distance runner, World Championships representative, Commonwealth Games bronze medallist, Australian Champion for 800m
 Touk MillerAustralian rules footballer with Gold Coast Suns
 Tony Morwoodformer Australian rules footballer with Sydney Swans
 Bill NettlefoldAustralian rules footballer with Richmond Tigers, North Melbourne Kangaroos, and Melbourne Demons
 Tom NichollsAustralian rules footballer with Gold Coast Suns
 Reilly O'BrienAustralian rules footballer with Adelaide Crows
 Ryan O'KeefeAustralian rules footballer with Sydney Swans
 Matthew OwiesAustralian rules footballer with Carlton Blues
 Connor Painfootballer with Melbourne Victory, Central Coast Mariners, and Western United
 Luke PennyAustralian rules footballer with Western Bulldogs and St Kilda Saints
 Stephen PowellAustralian rules footballer with Western Bulldogs, Melbourne Demons, and St Kilda Saints
 Steven Power - Australian rules footballer with Footscray (now Western Bulldogs)
 Ned ReevesAustralian rules footballer with Hawthorn Hawks
 James RowbottomAustralians rules footballer with Sydney Swans
 Alex RoweAustralian 800m record holder, Australian champion for 800m
 Brad ScottAustralian rules footballer with Hawthorn Hawks and Brisbane Lions, coach with North Melbourne Kangaroos
 Chris ScottAustralian rules footballer with Brisbane Lions, coach with Geelong Cats
 Conor StoneAustralian rules footballer with GWS Giants
 Tim TarantoAustralian rules footballer with GWS Giants
 Bill TymmsAustralian rules footballer with St Kilda Saints and Melbourne Demons
 Jordan Ueleserugby union player with Melbourne Rebels
 Mitch WallisAustralian rules footballer with Western Bulldogs
 Rhylee WestAustralian rules footballer with Western Bulldogs
 George Wardlaw
 Phil Wynd - Australian rules footballer with Hawthorn Hawks

See also

 Catholic education in Australia
 List of schools in Victoria, Australia
 List of high schools in Victoria
 List of Christian Brothers schools

References

External links
 
 St. Kevin's College Boat Club website
 St. Kevin's College Rugby Club website



Associated Public Schools of Victoria
Educational institutions established in 1918
Congregation of Christian Brothers secondary schools in Australia
Boys' schools in Victoria (Australia)
Catholic secondary schools in Melbourne
Junior School Heads Association of Australia Member Schools
1918 establishments in Australia
Choir schools
Catholic primary schools in Melbourne
Congregation of Christian Brothers primary schools in Australia
Buildings and structures in the City of Stonnington
Buildings and structures in the City of Yarra